The Adler’s mouse opossum (Marmosa adleri) is a species of opossum in the Marmosa genus in the family Didelphidae.

Discovery and naming 
The name Adler’s mouse opossum was named after Greg Adler, a biologist at the University of Wisconsin–Oshkosh The Adler’s mouse opossum was discovered in 2021 by a team of researchers from the American Museum of Natural History, Siena College and the Bell Museum at the University of Minnesota.

Reference 

Opossums
Mammals described in 2021